Edmund Hope Driggs (May 2, 1865 – September 27, 1946) was an American businessman and politician who served two terms as a United States representative from New York from 1897 to 1901.

Biography 
Born in Brooklyn, he attended the public schools and Adelphi Academy in Brooklyn. He became engaged in the casualty-insurance business.

Tenure in Congress 
Driggs was elected as a Democrat to the Fifty-fifth Congress to fill the vacancy caused by the resignation of Francis H. Wilson; he was reelected to the Fifty-sixth Congress and served from December 6, 1897, to March 3, 1901.

Career after Congress 
He was an unsuccessful candidate for reelection in 1900 to the Fifty-seventh Congress, and resumed the casualty-insurance business and also engaged in safety engineering. He died in Brooklyn in 1946, and interred in Cypress Hills Cemetery within the same borough.

References

1865 births
1946 deaths
Adelphi University alumni
Burials at Cypress Hills Cemetery
Democratic Party members of the United States House of Representatives from New York (state)
Edmund Hope
People from Brooklyn